The Nugget Sandstone is a Late Triassic to Early Jurassic geologic formation that outcrops in Colorado, Idaho, Wyoming, and Utah, western United States. 

In Wyoming, it is composed of a lower hematite-stained siltstone and thin-bedded sandstone. The upper part is a salmon-pink and light-gray, fine- to medium-grained cliff-forming sandstone that exhibits massive bedding to large scale cross-beds of dunes. Thickness ranges up to 86.9 m (285 feet).

Fossil theropod tracks have been reported from the formation.

Fossil content 
Intermediate theropod, sphenosuchian, drepanosaurid and sphenodontian remains are known.

Other fossils
 Rhynchosauroides sp.
 Lepidosauria indet.

Ichnofossils 
 Batrachopus sp.
 Brachychirotherium sp.
 Brasilichnium sp.
 Cochlichnus sp.
 Diplichnites sp.
 Grallator (Eubrontes)
 Gwyneddichnium sp.
 Octopodichnus sp.
 Otozoum sp.
 cf. Paleohelcura sp.
 Pterichnus sp.
 Scoyenia sp.
 Treptichnus sp.
 ?Acanthichnus sp.
 ?Apatopus sp.

See also 
 List of pterosaur-bearing stratigraphic units
 List of dinosaur-bearing rock formations
 List of stratigraphic units with theropod tracks

References

Bibliography 
 Weishampel, David B.; Dodson, Peter; and Osmólska, Halszka (eds.): The Dinosauria, 2nd, Berkeley: University of California Press. 861 pp.

Further reading 
 
 
 

Geologic formations of Colorado
Geologic formations of Idaho
Geologic formations of Utah
Triassic System of North America
Norian Stage
Rhaetian Stage
Jurassic System of North America
Hettangian Stage
Sinemurian Stage
Pliensbachian Stage
Toarcian Stage
Sandstone formations of the United States
Fluvial deposits
Lacustrine deposits
Ichnofossiliferous formations
Paleontology in Colorado
Paleontology in Idaho
Paleontology in Utah